The International Technical Committee for the Prevention and Extinction of Fire ( is the international association of fire and rescue services.

Established in 1900 the organization has at present 48 member countries and 46 associate members.

References

Fire protection organizations
International trade associations